Abhiraj Rajendra Mishra (born 1943) is a Sanskrit author, poet, lyricist, playwright and a former Vice-Chancellor of the Sampurnanand Sanskrit University, Varanasi.

He is the recipient of India's highly prestigious award Padma Shri 2020 for his work in the field of literature and education.

Personal life

He was born in Dronipur in Jaunpur district in Uttar Pradesh, to Pandit Durgaprasad Mishra and Abhiraji Devi. His Dīkṣā Guru is Jagadguru Rāmabhadrācārya, whose epic poem Gītarāmāyaṇam was released by him on 14 January 2011.

Career

He has served as the head of department of Sanskrit in Himachal Pradesh University, Shimla. He has also been a visiting professor at the University of Indonesia, the oldest university of Indonesia.

Abhiraj Rajendra Mishra is the winner of Sahitya Akademi Award for Sanskrit for the year 1988. He is popularly known as Triveṇī Kavi. He has composed many books in Sanskrit, Hindi, English and Bhojpuri.

After retirement, he settled in Shimla, Himachal Pradesh.

Works

His works include:

 Ikshugandha
 Aranyani
 Abhiraja-Yasobhushanam
 Dhara-Mandaviyam
 Janaki-Jivanam
 Madhuparni
 Samskrit Sahitya Mein Anyokti
 Sapta-Dhara
 Poetry and Poetics
 Abhiraja-Sahasrakam
 Natya-Panchagavyam
 Natya-Panchamritam
 Vag-Vadhuti
 Mridvika
 Srutimbhara
 Bali-Dvipe Bharatiya Samskritih
 Vimsa-Satabdi-Samskrita-Kavyamritam (ed.)
 Sejarah Kesusatraan Sanskerta (History of Sanskrit in Bahasa Indonesia)
 Suvarna-Dvipiya Rama-Katha
 Samskrita-Satakam

Awards and honours
 Sahitya Akademi Award for Sanskrit in 1988 for his collection of short stories Ikshugandha.
 Certificate of Honour from the President of India in 2002.
 Valmiki Samman
 Vachaspati Samman
 Vishva Bharati Samman by Uttar Pradesh Sanskrit Sansthan
 Sahitya Akademi Translation Prize 2013.

References

Living people
Recipients of the Sahitya Akademi Award in Sanskrit
1943 births
Indian male poets
20th-century Indian poets
Poets from Uttar Pradesh
20th-century Indian male writers
Recipients of the Padma Shri in literature & education
Recipients of the Sahitya Akademi Prize for Translation